The queen of clubs is a playing card in the standard 52-card deck.

Queen of Clubs may also refer to:
Queen of Clubs (film), a 1966 Greek film, directed by George Skalenakis
La dame de trèfle, a 2009 French film; se Laure Gardette
Queen of Clubs Trilogy: Ruby Edition, an album by Nadia Ali
Queen of Clubs Trilogy: Onyx Edition, an album by Nadia Ali
Queen of Clubs Trilogy: Diamond Edition, an album by Nadia Ali
"Queen of Clubs", a 1970's song from KC and the Sunshine Band.'s album Do It Good
"Queen of Clubs", a 2016 song by Azealia Banks from Slay-Z

See also

 or 

 Queen of Diamonds (disambiguation)
 Queen of Hearts (disambiguation)
 Queen of Spades (disambiguation)
 Jack of Clubs (disambiguation)
 King of Clubs (disambiguation)
 Ace of Clubs (disambiguation)